Steve Charles is a vitreoretinal surgeon who has developed many of the techniques and devices used by vitreoretinal surgeons worldwide. He is a board certified ophthalmologist and vitreoretinal surgeon, a mechanical/electrical engineer who has 48 patents or patents applied for, and has developed many of the techniques and devices used by vitreoretinal surgeons worldwide. He has performed over 38,000 vitreoretinal surgeries, lectured in 50 countries and operated in 25, delivered 17 named lectures, and over 1000 speaking trips. He authored a leading textbook in the field which is now in the 5th edition and in 6 languages and authored over 174 articles in the medical literature and over 50 book chapters.

Education 
After four years in engineering school, he completed medical school at the University of Miami School of Medicine. He did research all four medical school years at the Bascom Palmer Eye Institute. After a medical internship at Jackson Memorial Hospital in Miami he completed a residency at the Bascom Palmer Eye Institute followed by a two-year Clinical Associate appointment at the National Eye Institute (NIH); focused on vitreoretinal surgery, angiogenesis research, and medical device engineering.

Societies, honors, and awards
He is a Fellow in the American College of Surgeons and International College of Surgeons and a member of the Retina Society, Macular Society, American Society of Retinal Specialists, Club Jules Gonin, American Society of Cataract and Refractive Surgery, American Academy of Ophthalmology, American-European College of Ophthalmic Surgery, Euro-Lam, and the Dowling Society. He is on the Board of Governors of the ARVO Foundation for Eye Research. He is on the editorial board of Retina and a reviewer for Ophthalmology, Archives of Ophthalmology, American Journal of Ophthalmology, and British Journal of Ophthalmology, writes a column for Retina Physician and is an editor for eMedicine.

He has received the Wacker Medal at the Club Jules Gonin (2002), the first Founders Medal of American Society of Vitreoretinal Surgeons (ASRS), The Award of Merit in Retina Research Presented in Conjunction with the Charles L. Schepens Lecture (2016), the Charles D. Kelman, MD Innovator’s Lecture at American Society of Cataract and Refractive Surgery (ASCRS) (2018), and the American Academy of Ophthalmology Laureate honoree (2018).

Dr. Charles was inducted into the University of Miami School of Medicine Medical Alumni Association Hall of Fame and was named by Ocular Surgery News as one of the top ten innovators in the past 25 years. He is consistently listed in Best Doctors in America and Becker’s Top 34 Ophthalmologists in America. He is a Clinical Professor of Ophthalmology at the University of Tennessee.

Personal life
Dr. Charles is an Airline Transport Pilot with five jet type ratings, currently owning and flying a Falcon 50. He is the father of three daughters, and has two grandchildren.

References

External links
Who is Steve Charles?
Curriculum Vitae
Charles Retina Institute

American ophthalmologists
Living people
Leonard M. Miller School of Medicine alumni
Year of birth missing (living people)